Sand Branch may refer to:

Places
Sand Branch, Dallas County, Texas, an unincorporated community

Streams
Sand Branch (Prairie Creek), a stream in Missouri
Sand Branch, Gonzales County, Texas, a Stream in Gonzales County, Texas  
Sand Branch, Madison County, Texas, a Stream in Madison County, Texas